Dama y obrero (Lit: Lady and Worker / English: Labor of Love) is a Spanish-language telenovela produced by United States-based television network Telemundo Studios, Miami. It is a remake of the Chilean telenovela of the same title produced by TVN in 2012. Ana Layevska and José Luis Reséndez stars as the protagonists, while Fabián Ríos, Felicia Mercado and Sofía Lama stars as the antagonists.

On June 24, 2013, Telemundo broadcast Dama y Obrero, replacing Pasión Prohibida. The last episode was broadcast on October 18, as part of Telemundo's changes in prime-time programming, and because of low ratings. On October 21, 2 hours of Marido en Alquiler have been temporarily broadcast weeknights at 8pm/7c. As with most of its other telenovelas, the network broadcast English subtitles as closed captions on CC3.

Plot 
Ignacia (Ana Layevska) is a young engineer working at a large construction company, Omega Construction, which is owned by Tomás Villamayor (Fabián Ríos), her boyfriend. They spend much time together and finally decide to get married, but Ignacia misconceives the kind of person that Tomás really is. Shortly before their wedding, they have a very strong fight in which Tomas tries to hit her but is foiled by the intervention of Pedro. that makes Ignacia leave the town and take time for reflection.

She meets Pedro o Pérez (Jose Luis Resendez), a simple laborer without money and big aspirations, who makes her forget all her problems. The attraction between the two is immediate and mutual (love at first sight). They cannot avoid spending a memorable weekend together, which ends on a Sunday afternoon by when the two are madly in love with each other. However, Ignacia knows that, what she is experiencing is a dream, a parenthesis in her life. When Pedro awakes on Monday morning, he thus finds a note at his side saying that Ignacia thanks him, and she is leaving without a trace.

On Ignacia's return home, Tomás is awaiting her with the news that he is offering her a new position in his company and he is looking for her forgiveness. She agrees but gets surprised when she comes to the workplace in her position of construction supervisor to see Pedro as a worker at the construction site. Despite having every reason in the world not to be together, Ignacia and Pedro discover that their love persists over all prejudices, differences, rejection and, the many, sometimes cruel, obstacles raised by others, who want to see them apart.

Cast

Main 

 Ana Layevska as Ignacia Santamaría
 José Luis Reséndez as Pedro Pérez
 Fabián Ríos as Tomás Villamayor
 Felicia Mercado as Estela Mendoza
 Mónica Sánchez Navarro as Margarita Pérez
 Shalim Ortíz  as José Manuel Correal
 Leonardo Daniel as Mariano Santamaría
 Sofia Lama as Mireya Gómez
 Tina Romero as Alfonsina Cardemil
 Riccardo Dalmacci as Olegario Gómez
 Christina Dieckmann as Karina Cuervo
 Lilian Tapia as Berta Suárez / Gina Pérez
 Alex Ruiz as Christopher Melquíades Godínez 
 Óscar Priego as Rubén Santamaría

 Roberto Plantier as Ángel García
 Carolina Ayala as Guadalupe "Lupita" Pérez

Recurring 
 Diana Quijano as Gina Pérez
 Kendra Santacruz as Isabel García
 Rosalinda Rodríguez as Petra García
 Alexander Torres as El Ratón
 Héctor Fuentes as Enrique Molina
 Angeline Moncayo as Gema Pacheco Maldonado
 Osvaldo Strongoli as Ernesto Villamayor

Awards and nominations

References

External links 
Telemundo Now, Telemundo Full Episodes

2013 American television series debuts
American television series based on telenovelas
Spanish-language American telenovelas
Telemundo telenovelas
Television series by Universal Television
2013 telenovelas
2013 American television series endings
American television series based on Chilean television series